

1st congressional district special election
Incumbent Democratic Congressman William H. Brawley of the 1st congressional district, in office since 1891, resigned in 1894.  A special election was called for April and it pitted two Democrats against each other because the South Carolina Democratic Party refused to organize a primary election.  James F. Izlar defeated J. William Stokes in the special election to win the remainder of the term for the 53rd Congress.

General election results

|-
| 
| colspan=5 |Democratic hold
|-

1st congressional district
The 1st congressional district was redrawn in 1894 to cover much of the South Carolina Lowcountry.  William Elliott defeated D.A.J. Sullivan in the Democratic primary and Republican challenger George W. Murray in the general election.  However, Murray challenged the election and the Republican controlled Congress awarded him the seat from Elliott in 1896.

Democratic primary

General election results

|-
| 
| colspan=5 |Democratic hold
|-

2nd congressional district
Incumbent Democratic Congressman W. Jasper Talbert of the 2nd congressional district, in office since 1893, was unopposed in his bid for re-election.

General election results

|-
| 
| colspan=5 |Democratic hold
|-

3rd congressional district
Incumbent Democratic Congressman Asbury Latimer of the 3rd congressional district, in office since 1893, defeated Republican Robert Moorman in the general election.

General election results

|-
| 
| colspan=5 |Democratic hold
|-

4th congressional district
Incumbent Democratic Congressman George W. Shell of the 4th congressional district, in office since 1891, declined to seek re-election.  Stanyarne Wilson won the Democratic primary and defeated Republican Lawson D. Melton in the general election.

Democratic primary

General election results

|-
| 
| colspan=5 |Democratic hold
|-

5th congressional district
Incumbent Democratic Congressman Thomas J. Strait of the 5th congressional district, in office since 1893, defeated David E. Finley in the Democratic primary and Republican G.G. Alexander in the general election.

Democratic primary

General election results

|-
| 
| colspan=5 |Democratic hold
|-

6th congressional district
Incumbent Democratic Congressman John L. McLaurin of the 6th congressional district, in office since 1893, defeated Republican challenger J.P. Wilson.

General election results

|-
| 
| colspan=5 |Democratic hold
|-

7th congressional district
The 7th congressional district was redrawn in 1894 to include much of the lower central part of the state.  J. William Stokes was nominated by the Democrats and defeated Republican T.B. Johnson in the general election.

General election results

|-
| 
| colspan=5 |Democratic gain from Republican
|-

See also
United States House of Representatives elections, 1894
South Carolina gubernatorial election, 1894
South Carolina's congressional districts

References

"Report of the Secretary of State to the General Assembly of South Carolina.  Election Returns." Reports and Resolutions of the General Assembly of the State of South Carolina at the Regular Session Commencing Nov. 27th, 1894. Volume II. Columbia, SC: Charles A. Calvo, Jr., 1894, pp. 466–469.

South Carolina
1894
South Carolina